Ghatkopar East Assembly constituency is one of the 26 Vidhan Sabha constituencies located in the Mumbai Suburban district.

Ghatkopar East is part of the Mumbai North East Lok Sabha constituency along with five other Vidhan Sabha segments, namely Mulund, Ghatkopar West, Bhandup West, Mankhurd Shivaji Nagar and Vikhroli in the Mumbai Suburban district.

Members of Legislative Assembly

Election results

2019 result

Assembly Elections 2014

Assembly Elections 2009

See also
 List of constituencies of Maharashtra Vidhan Sabha

References

Assembly constituencies of Mumbai
Assembly constituencies of Maharashtra
Politics of Mumbai Suburban district